George Jendrus "Andy" Anderson (September 26, 1889 – May 28, 1962) was a Major League Baseball player from Cleveland, Ohio. He played as an outfielder for the Brooklyn Tip-Tops of the Federal League (1914 and 1915), and the St. Louis Cardinals (1918).

George died in Cleveland at the age of 72, and was buried in All Souls Cemetery located in Chardon, Ohio.

Sources

1889 births
1962 deaths
St. Louis Cardinals players
Brooklyn Tip-Tops players
Baseball players from Cleveland
Major League Baseball outfielders
Duluth White Sox players
Providence Grays (minor league) players
Wilkes-Barre Barons (baseball) players
Milwaukee Brewers (minor league) players